Trout River may refer to:

Rivers in Canada:
 Trout River (British Columbia), a tributary of the Liard River
 Trout River (Northwest Territories), a tributary of the Mackenzie River
 Trout River (Quebec), a river in Quebec

Rivers in the United States:
 Trout River (Florida), a tributary of the St. Johns River
 Trout River (Iowa), a tributary of the Upper Iowa River
 Trout River (Michigan), flows into Lake Huron
 Trout River (Vermont), a tributary of the Missisquoi River

Places:
 Trout River, Newfoundland and Labrador, a village in Canada
 Trout River, New York, a hamlet in the United States

See also
 Salmon Trout River
 Trout River Brewing
 Trout River Bridge
 Trout Run (disambiguation)